The Buffs was an association football team formed of players from the Royal East Kent Regiment. It played in Hong Kong First Division League in the past. The team is now dissolved.

The Buffs were the inaugural champions of Hong Kong First Division League.

Honours
 Hong Kong First Division League
 Winners (2): 1908–09, 1910–11

See also
 Buffs (Royal East Kent Regiment)
 Hong Kong First Division League
 List of Hong Kong football champions

Football clubs in Hong Kong
Military association football clubs in Hong Kong